The Augusteum is a German art museum in the city of Oldenburg, Lower Saxony. The museum houses the old master painting collection of the State Museum for Art and Cultural History.

The museum opened in 1876 as Oldenburg's first art museum. The building is in the neo-Renaissance style. The Augusteum presents old master artworks including examples by Christian Griepenkerl and Johann Heinrich Wilhelm Tischbein. The Augusteum building is near the northeast corner of the Schlossgarten Oldenburg. The Prinzenpalais, Elisabeth-Anna-Palais, and Schloss Oldenburg are all close to the museum.

Gallery

Further reading

See also
 Augusteum
 List of visitor attractions in Oldenburg

References

External links

 

1876 establishments in Germany
Buildings and structures completed in 1876
Art museums established in 1876
Buildings and structures in Oldenburg (city)
Tourist attractions in Oldenburg (city)
Museums in Lower Saxony
Art museums and galleries in Germany
Renaissance Revival architecture in Germany